Manjot Kaur (born 1989) is a contemporary Indian artist, who lives and works in Chandigarh.

About 
She completed her BFA and MFA (University Gold Medal) in the field of Painting from Government College of Arts, Chandigarh, in 2010 and 2012 respectively. Her mediums range from drawing to video, interactive performance, land art and installation.

Practice 
Her practice builds between the socio-political realities and the sovereignty of nature. Her work is an interface between science, nature, perception, abstraction, and scale inciting a discourse on the social, cultural and personal issues, through the careful representation of objects and narratives rooted in temporal, ephemeral, and entropy. She is profoundly concerned with abstraction and how abstraction can be political in its edge.

Biography 
She is the recipient of scholarship by Inlaks Shivdasani Foundation, New Delhi for a stand-alone residency in Unidee, Cittadellarte Fondazione Pistolleto, Italy. She has received professional Category Annual Award, Punjab Lalit Kala Akademi (State Academy of Art), Chandigarh, India, 2018; Sohan Qadri Fellowship, Chandigarh Lalit Kala Akademi (State Academy of Art), Chandigarh, India 2017; Professional and Student Category Annual Award, Chandigarh Lalit Kala Akademi (State Academy of Art), Chandigarh, India, 2017 and 2012, respectively and Scholarship to Young Artists, Chandigarh Lalit Kala Akademi (State Academy of Art), Chandigarh, India in 2011. She was chosen by Hindustan Times as one of the Top 30 under 30 young achievers in 2017.

She has been an artist in residence at Unidee, Citadellarte – Fondazione Pistolleto, Italy for the year 2018 on full scholarship by Inlaks Shivdasani Foundation, New Delhi; Museo Casa Masaccio Centro per l’Arte Contemporanea, San Giovanni Valdarno (Italy) – a cross-institutional program with Clark House Initiative, Mumbai, India; Khoj International Artists’ Association – Peers18, New Delhi; Mythos – Land Art Biel/Bienne, Switzerland 2017;  Gram Art Project - funded by FICA, India 2016; Harmony Art Foundation, Mumbai, India 2015; Global Nomadic Art Project, India 2015.

Her works are in the collection of Museo Casa Masaccio Centro per l’Arte Contemporanea, San Giovanni Valdarno (Italy), Govt. Museum and Art Gallery, Chandigarh, India, Personal collection Prof. B. N. Goswamy, India and Tellusart, Sweden.

References

1989 births
Living people
Artists from Punjab, India
Punjabi people
20th-century Indian painters
Artists from Chandigarh
Indian installation artists
Indian video artists
Punjabi women